PCRC may be an abbreviation for:
 Panama Canal Railway Company, an operator of the Panama Canal Railway
 Peninsula Conflict Resolution Center